AK-47 is a 2020 Russian biographical film about the experiences of Mikhail Kalashnikov, inventor of the AK-47 assault rifle.

Elena Kalashnikova, the designer's daughter and a consultant to the Kalashnikov Concern, took part in the production of the film.
The film was directed by Konstantin Buslov, and stars Yuri Borisov, Olga Lerman, Artur Smolyaninov, and Eldar Kalimulin.

The premiere took place in Russia on February 20, 2020 by Megogo Distribution.

Plot 
The film begins with a sequence (supplemented by subsequent flashbacks) in which Mikhail Kalashnikov, a young farmer's son from Altai, is seen secretly working on a functional toy rifle. The film switches to the year 1941, in the midst of World War II, where the now adult senior sergeant Kalashnikov serves as a tank commander in the Red Army. During the Battle of Bryansk, Kalashnikov is seriously wounded while taking out a German anti-tank gun, and he is taken off the frontlines. While being transported to the rear, he and a companion encounter a group of German soldiers, and he witnesses his comrade's new submachine gun jam at a critical moment due to design faults in the magazine. This inspires him to use his self-acquired talent at inventing to design a new automatic weapon for the Soviet army.

On his way home, Kalashnikov visits Matai Station in Alma-Ata, Kazakhstan, where he previously worked as an engineer but was dismissed for using the depot's workshop to build his private weapon designs. He appeals to his former superior, Krotov, to let him assemble his latest invention, but Krotov refuses. When Kalashnikov proposes his design to a passing high-ranking officer named Basarov, he gets authorization to proceed, and with the help of the Station's workers he successfully assembles his new submachine gun. While trying to bring it to Basarov, he is mistakenly arrested, but Basarov takes notice of the gun's innovative design and has it sent off for evaluation. As a result, Kalashnikov is released and encouraged to present his gun to General Pavel Kurbatkin, the district commander of Central Asia, who approves him for a national arms design competition.

Kalashnikov is sent to Golutvin, the Shchurov arms testing facility, where he is to compete against prestigious arms designers like Alexey Sudayev and Sergei Korovin; there he also meets Ekaterina Moiseeva, a female design assistant and his future wife. While his weapon ultimately loses to Sudayev's gun, he is given permission to work on new designs, and his friends also encourage him to continue his work. By the time the war comes to an end, Kalashnikov has a new automatic rifle ready and is sent to the Kovrov Arms Factory to improve on it. Impatient to see if it works, and denied a test at the firing range, he conducts his own successful trial, upon which he is arrested for testing his gun in the open without authorization and brought to General Vasily Degtyaryov, a notable arms designer whom Kalashnikov considers his fiercest competitor. However, Degtyaryov, expressing his sincere respect for Kalashnikov's talent and the superiority of his design, removes himself from the competition. Tested under extreme conditions (after being immersed in water and sand), the new rifle passes. In 1949, following the first major field testing, the new weapon is approved for mass production. Kalashnikov is decorated and given an extended leave of absence, which he uses to visit his mother at his home farm along with his wife and children.

Cast 
 Yuri Borisov as Mikhail Kalashnikov
 Olga Lerman as Ekaterina 'Katya' Moiseyeva 
 Artur Smolyaninov as Captain Vasily Lyutyy
 Eldar Kalimulin as Aleksandr Zaitsev (credited as Zaytsev)
 Vitaly Khaev as Major General Pavel Kurbatkin 
 Valery Barinov as Major General Vasily Degtyaryov 
 Anatoly Lobotsky as Colonel Glukhov
  as Captain Lobov, NKVD 
 Dmitry Bogdan as Major Alexey Sudayev
 Maksim Bityukov as Kazakov
 Armen Arushanyan as Saakyants
 Valery Afanasiev as Chief Marshal Nikolay Voronov
 Sergey Gazarov as Pavel Krotov
 Seydulla Moldakhanov as Lieutenant Colonel Basarov
 Dmitry Kulichkov as Major Lebedev
 Igor Khripunov as deputy Degtyarev
 Yuriy Loparyov as Kuzmich
 Aleksandr Nikolsky as uncle Misha
 Mikhail Gudoshnikov as Kravchenko
 Yevgeniy Antropov as lieutenant in Alma-Ata
 Amadu Mamadakov as guard in Alma-Ata
 Yevgeniy Kartashov as officer in Golutvin

Production
The lead actor Yuri Borisov emphasizes that he actively studied the life path of his character, engaged in the search and collection of alternative sources, wishing to realize the complexity of the character of the gunsmith with his complexes and reflections. According to Borisov, he personally saw Kalashnikov, and when he passed by, “something directly flew out of him and flew to me! And then I walked around the site with it”.

Filming
Work on the film began in August 2018, filming was carried out, including in the Apraksins' Estate, Dmitrovsky District, Moscow Oblast, in the Republic of Crimea, in the town of Torzhok, Torzhoksky District, Tver Oblast and Shushary near Saint Petersburg, scenes with locomotives were filmed. In addition, locomotives were involved in large numbers in the Locomotive Depot of the Podmoskovnaya station when filming scenes at Matai Station (Kazakhstan Temir Zholy), where Kalashnikov began working on his first submachine gun.

Costumes and props were provided by Mosfilm Studios; they also supported in the dubbing and recording of sound. The scene of the Bryansk tank battle was filmed at the Voyenfilm cinema complex near Medyn, Medynsky District, Kaluga Oblast, using the scenery of the painting "Ilinsky frontier".

All models of weapons developed by Kalashnikov were specially restored according to drawings received from the Military Historical Museum of Artillery, Engineers and Signal Corps in St. Petersburg.

Release
On February 15, 2020, a special screening of the film took place in the city of Izhevsk. The film was theatrically released in the Russian Federation on February 20, 2020 by Megogo Distribution.

References

External links 
 

2020 films
2020s Russian-language films
2020s biographical films
Russian biographical films
Biographical films about military personnel
Russian World War II films
2010s war films
Films set in 1941
Films set in 1943
Films set in 1945
Films set in 1946
Films set in 1947
Films set in the Soviet Union
Films set in Kazakhstan
Eastern Front of World War II films
World War II films based on actual events
Films shot in Crimea
Films shot in Saint Petersburg
Films shot in Russia